John Cornelius Palmer (July 3, 1918 – September 14, 2006) was an American professional golfer.

Born in Eldorado, North Carolina, Palmer won seven times on the PGA Tour in the 1940s and 1950s, and was a member of the Ryder Cup team 1949.

Palmer died in Albemarle, North Carolina, at the age of 88.

Professional wins (18)

PGA Tour wins (7)

PGA Tour playoff record (2–1)

Sources:

Other wins (11)
this list may be incomplete
1941 Carolinas Open
1947 Utah Open
1948 Carolinas PGA Championship
1949 Carolinas Open, Carolinas PGA Championship
1950 Carolinas Open
1951 Carolinas PGA Championship
1952 Carolinas PGA Championship
1954 Mexican Open, Carolinas PGA Championship
1957 Oklahoma Open

Results in major championships

Note: Palmer never played in The Open Championship.

NT = no tournament
CUT = missed the half-way cut (3rd round cut in 1958 PGA Championship)
R64, R32, R16, QF, SF = round in which player lost in PGA Championship match play
"T" indicates a tie for a place

Summary

Most consecutive cuts made – 31 (1941 U.S. Open – 1957 Masters)
Longest streak of top-10s – 3 (1949 Masters – 1949 PGA)

See also
List of golfers with most PGA Tour wins

References

American male golfers
PGA Tour golfers
Ryder Cup competitors for the United States
Golfers from North Carolina
People from Montgomery County, North Carolina
1918 births
2006 deaths